Eupithecia extensaria, the scarce pug,  is a moth of the family Geometridae. The species was first described by Christian Friedrich Freyer in 1844.
It is found in the British Isles (rare, and confined to eastern saltmarshes), Spain and eastern Europe.

The wingspan is 21–25 mm.
The moth flies in both May and June.

The larvae feed on sea wormwood (Artemisia maritima).

Subspecies
Eupithecia extensaria extensaria
Eupithecia extensaria leuca Dietze, 1910
Eupithecia extensaria occidua Prout, 1914

References

extensaria
Moths described in 1844
Moths of Europe